The Legendary 'Tai Fei' (古惑仔激情篇之洪興大飛哥) is a 1999 Hong Kong film directed by Kant Leung and starring Anthony Wong. It is a spin-off to the Young and Dangerous film series.

Synopsis
The film centralizes on the storyline after Tai Fei (Anthony Wong) obtains branch leader status after Young and Dangerous 4. Tai Fei discovers he has a son, and soon realizes that he is a triad member involved in the Tung Hing gang which deals in narcotics.

External links
 

Hong Kong action films
1999 films
Films set in Hong Kong
1990s Cantonese-language films
Young and Dangerous
1990s Hong Kong films